Aenictus gracilis is a species of reddish brown army ant found in Borneo, Indonesia, Malaysia, Philippines, Bangladesh, India, Myanmar, and Sri Lanka.

References

External links

 at antwiki.org

Dorylinae
Hymenoptera of Asia
Insects described in 1893